Moscufo (locally Muscùfe) is a comune and town in the province of Pescara in the Abruzzo region of Italy.

Main sights
Parish church of San Cristoforo
Palazzo Orsini
Abbey church of Santa Maria del Lago (12th century), an example of Romanesque architecture. Its interior is decorated with frescoes, and include a polychrome ambon , sculpted with biblical scenes by the same master Nicodemo who also worked in the church of Santa Maria in Valle Porclaneta.

Twin towns
 Mława, Poland

Sources

Cities and towns in Abruzzo